Charter College International High School is a private, Cambridge high school situated in Johannesburg, South Africa. It was established in 2008.

Subjects Offered

Charter College offers 13 subjects, in grade 8 and 9 students take all subjects however in Grade 10 students pick from the following: Accounting, Art, Biology, Chemistry, Physics, Design And Technology, History, Economics and Business. They can also take either Maths CORE or Extended as well mandatory English, Life Orientation and a second language.

References

Schools in Johannesburg
Educational institutions established in 2008
2008 establishments in South Africa